Rosalind Emily Majors Rickaby  is a professor of biogeochemistry at the Department of Earth Sciences, University of Oxford and a Professorial Fellow at University College, Oxford. She is an Emeritus Fellow of Wolfson College, Oxford.

Education 
Rickaby was educated at Berkhamsted School for Girls and Haileybury College. She received her Master of Arts degree in Natural Sciences from the University of Cambridge where she was an undergraduate student at Magdalene College, Cambridge in 1995 and her PhD from the University’s Department of Earth Sciences in 1999, under the supervision of Harry Elderfield.

Career and research 
After her PhD, Rickaby went on to complete two years of post-doctoral research at the Department of Earth and Planetary Sciences at Harvard University, working with Dan Schrag. Rickaby began as a faculty member of the Department of Earth Sciences at the University of Oxford following her postdoc at Harvard. Her research centers around paleoceanography and biogeochemical cycling in the oceans through deep time, with a focus on using fossil shells of marine micro-organisms as proxies to reconstruct past climate change.  Her research group uses a variety of geochemical methods, including the analysis of trace element and isotopic ratios, to understand the biochemical behavior of paleoproxies, such as coccolithophores. She is also an author of the book Evolution's Destiny: Co-evolving Chemistry of the Environment and Life along with Bob Williams.

Awards and honours 

 2008: Awarded the European Geosciences Union Philip Leverhulme Prize for Outstanding Young Scientist
 2009: Awarded the University of Miami's 36th Rosenstiel Award
 2010: Awarded the James B. Macelwane Medal for significant contributions to the geophysical sciences by an outstanding young scientist
 2012: Awarded the Gast lectureship for outstanding contributions to geochemistry
 2016: Awarded the Wolfson Research Merit Award by the Royal Society from 2016–2021 
 2017: Awarded the Geological Society of London's Lyell Medal for contributions to soft rock studies
 2022: Elected a Fellow of the Royal Society (FRS)

References 

Living people
Harvard University alumni
Lyell Medal winners
Fellows of the Royal Society
Alumni of the University of Cambridge
Biogeochemists
British women earth scientists
21st-century British scientists
21st-century British women scientists
Fellows of University College, Oxford
Fellows of Wolfson College, Oxford
1974 births